Cyanopepla is a genus of moths in the subfamily Arctiinae. The genus was erected by James Brackenridge Clemens in 1861.

Species

References

External links

 
Euchromiina
Moth genera